Express trains are express rail services of India. Express trains make a small number of stops, unlike ordinary passenger or local trains. Because of their limited stops, these trains are able to obtain the highest speeds of any trains in India. An express train is one where the average speed, excluding halts, is greater than 42 km/h. Including halts the average speed often is below 42 km/h. Although this is pretty slow as compared to international standards, the "Express" trains here mean faster than the ordinary passenger and local trains. In some cases, trains run express where there is an overlapping passenger train service available, and run as passenger train, where there is no supplemental passenger service.

Superfast

Superfast trains are express trains which make still fewer stops, as compared to ordinary express trains, achieving still shorter journey times. Tickets cost more than ordinary express trains as they have "superfast surcharge" added to them. Trains with an average speed, excluding halts, equaling or exceeding  ( until the early 1990s) on both up and down journeys fall into this category and are numbered with a prefix of 12 or 22 or 20 (previously 2). Including halts the average speed often is below 55 km/h. In some cases, trains run superfast where there is an overlapping express service available, and run as ordinary express trains where there is no supplementary express service.
Maximum Speed for SuperFast Trains:110km/hr.

Mail

Mail trains are the trains which earlier exclusively had mail coaches. These coaches were named as "Railway Mail Service" coaches, and were operated with collaboration between the railways and the postal department. Nowadays, mail trains no longer have these coaches. The mail trains carry mail in the luggage coach itself, but the train branding continues to be in use.

Un-reserved travel

The Jan Sadharan Express and Antyodaya Express are fully Unreserved/General express trains. These trains have all Unreserved/General coaches.

Apart from Antyodaya and Jan Sadharan trains, unreserved/general coaches are also present in express trains. A new series of Deen Dayalu coaches has also been proposed for long-distance trains. The Deen Dayalu coaches are more comfortable than the existing old coaches.

Speed 
Of this, counting up and down trains separately, 23 trains have an average speed more than 80 km/h, whereas 72 trains have an average speed between 70 and 80 km/h. The speed of express trains is calculated from the latest Indian Railways timetable.

The design of the railway switches, with a speed limit of 50–90 km/h, is the major bottleneck to higher speed. Another constraint is the need to accommodate freight trains at the current top speed of 70 km/h. These constraints to speed are consequences of sharing tracks with freight and lower speed suburban passenger trains.

The train stops reduce the average running speed of a train by preventing it from gaining higher speed. The distance between stops is as short as 2 km between New Bongaigaon-Bongaigaon on the Howrah–Dibrugarh Kamrup Express, and as long as 528 km between Vadodara–Kota on the Thiruvananthapuram Rajdhani Express.

 High-speed rail in India
 List of high-speed railway lines in India
 MEMU
 Slow and fast passenger trains in India
 Suburban trains

References

External links 
 List of All Express and Mail Trains
 List of All Superfast Trains